Clancy Cooper (July 23, 1906 – June 14, 1975) was an American actor.

He appeared in more than 100 films between 1938 and 1962. He also guest-starred on numerous TV series, such as The Rifleman, Lawman, Wanted: Dead or Alive, Maverick, and Alfred Hitchcock Presents; he also appeared on Sanford and Son as Kelly, an elderly friend of Fred Sanford, in the episode "The Copper Caper", the fourth episode in the first season of the series. He appeared as the Sheriff in The Lone Ranger (TV series) 1949 episode (1/15) "Old Joe's Sister".

Cooper's Broadway credits as an actor included Eight O'Clock Tuesday (1941), Horse Fever (1940), Night Music (1940), The Man Who Killed Lincoln (1940), Summer Night (1939), Stop Press (1939), The Fabulous Invalid (1938), and Casey Jones (1938). He also directed plays.

Selected filmography

 Mr. Wong, Detective (1938) - Warehouse Man (uncredited)
 Flying G-Men (1939, Serial) - Truck Driver (uncredited)
 High Sierra (1941) - Policeman George Asking for ID (uncredited)
 Double Cross (1941) - Police Radio Dispatcher (uncredited)
 They Died with Their Boots On (1941) - Train Conductor (uncredited)
 All Through the Night (1942) - Police Sergeant (uncredited)
 West of Tombstone (1942) - Dave Shurlock
 The Man Who Returned to Life (1942) - Clem Beebe
 Unseen Enemy (1942) - Police Inspector Alan Davies
 Juke Girl (1942) - Farmer in Muckeye's (uncredited)
 The Big Shot (1942) - Amos Haskell—Prison Guard (uncredited)
 Flight Lieutenant (1942) - Scanlon (uncredited)
 The Pride of the Yankees (1942) - Motorcycle Cop #1 (uncredited)
 Wings for the Eagle (1942) - Policeman at Restaurant (uncredited)
 The Secret Code (1942, Serial) - Det. Sgt. Pat Flanagan
 A Man's World (1942) - John Black
 Street of Chance (1942) - Burke
 Riding Through Nevada (1942) - Ed Kendall
 Dead Man's Gulch (1943) - Walt Bledsoe
 The Human Comedy (1943) - Mess Sergeant (uncredited)
 Redhead from Manhattan (1943) - Policeman
 Girls in Chains (1943) - Marcus
 Frontier Fury (1943) - Dan Bentley (uncredited)
 The Man from Down Under (1943) - Foreman (uncredited)
 Deerslayer (1943) - Mr. Barlow
 Whistling in Brooklyn (1943) - Police Officer Slocum (uncredited)
 Timber Queen (1944) - Barney (uncredited)
 Sundown Valley (1944) - Hodge Miller (uncredited)
 The Whistler (1944) - Telephone Repairman (uncredited)
 Gambler's Choice (1944) - Tim Riley (uncredited)
 Riding West (1944) - Blackburn
 Take It Big (1944) - Telephone Man (uncredited)
 Haunted Harbor (1944, Serial) - Yank
 The Last Ride (1944) - Police Sgt. Naylor (uncredited)
 Mystery of the River Boat (1944, Serial) - Police Sergeant (scenes deleted)
 Cyclone Prairie Rangers (1944) - Henry Vogel (uncredited)
 The Thin Man Goes Home (1944) - Butcher in Montage (uncredited)
 High Powered (1945) - Plant Boss (uncredited)
 Without Love (1945) - Sergeant
 Dangerous Partners (1945) - Ben Albee (uncredited)
 Bewitched (1945) - Cop (uncredited)
 State Fair (1945) - Policeman (uncredited)
 Mildred Pierce (1945) - Policeman (uncredited)
 Danger Signal (1945) - Police Captain with Suicide Note (uncredited)
 Sing Your Way Home (1945) - F.B.I. Man (uncredited)
 The Enchanted Forest (1945) - Gilson
 Dragonwyck (1946) - Farmer (uncredited)
 The Wife of Monte Cristo (1946) - Baptiste
 Somewhere in the Night (1946) - Tom - Sanitarium Guard (uncredited)
 Centennial Summer (1946) - Carpenter (uncredited)
 Courage of Lassie (1946) - Casey
 It Shouldn't Happen to a Dog (1946) - House Detective (uncredited)
 Below the Deadline (1946) - Nichols
 The Strange Woman (1946) - Lumberjack (uncredited)
 The Best Years of Our Lives (1946) - Taxi Driver (uncredited)
 Gallant Bess (1946) - Chief Petty Officer (uncredited)
 California (1947) - Cavalry N.C.O. (uncredited)
 Nora Prentiss (1947) - Policeman (uncredited)
 Cheyenne (1947) - Andrews (uncredited)
 The Crimson Key (1947) - Club Doorman (uncredited)
 Deep Valley (1947) - Guard (uncredited)
 Dark Passage (1947) - Man on Street Seeking Match (uncredited)
 Unconquered (1947) - Sentry (uncredited)
 Railroaded! (1947) - Detective Jim Chubb
 Nightmare Alley (1947) - Stage Manager (uncredited)
 Her Husband's Affairs (1947) - Window Washer (uncredited)
 The Gangster (1947) - Dan - Karty's Brother-in-Law (uncredited)
 The Man from Texas (1948) - Jim Walsh - Henchman (uncredited)
 The Sainted Sisters (1948) - Cal Frisbee
 Lulu Belle (1948) - Ed - Bartender (uncredited)
 Road House (1948) - Policeman at Road House (uncredited)
 Joan of Arc (1948) - Soldier #1 (uncredited)
 Mr. Belvedere Goes to College (1949) - Mac - Police Officer #97 (uncredited)
 Reign of Terror (1949) - Saint Just's Sentry (uncredited)
 Trapped (1949) - Desk Sergeant (uncredited)
 Prison Warden (1949) - McCall - Gate Guard (uncredited)
 Song of Surrender (1949) - Mr. Torrance
 Mary Ryan, Detective (1949) - Patrolman McBride (uncredited)
 Bride for Sale (1949) - Finley (uncredited)
 Whirlpool (1949) - First Policeman (uncredited)
 Life of St. Paul Series (1949) - Blacksmith in Cyprus
 The File on Thelma Jordon (1950) - Chase (uncredited)
 Dakota Lil (1950) - Bartender
 The Great Rupert (1950) - Police Lt. Saunders
 Where the Sidewalk Ends (1950) - Police Desk Sergeant Murphy (uncredited)
 Convicted (1950) - Prison Guard (uncredited)
 Southside 1-1000 (1950) - Police Desk Sergeant
 He Ran All the Way (1951) - Stan
 The Tall Target (1951) - Brakeman (uncredited)
 Distant Drums (1951) - Sgt. Shane (uncredited)
 The Wild North (1952) - Sloan
 Deadline - U.S.A. (1952) - Police Captain Finlay (uncredited)
 Lydia Bailey (1952) - Codman (uncredited)
 Flat Top (1952) - Captain (uncredited)
 Because of You (1952) - Federal Agent (uncredited)
 The Man Behind the Gun (1953) - 'Kansas' Collins
 The Silver Whip (1953) - Bert Foley (uncredited)
 Pickup on South Street (1953) - Detective Eddie (uncredited)
 Here Come the Girls (1953) - Otto (uncredited)
 All the Brothers Were Valiant (1953) - Smith
 Living It Up (1954) - Newspaper Slugger (uncredited)
 Artists and Models (1955) - Police Officer (uncredited)
 The Square Jungle (1955) - Mike Walsh (uncredited)
 Somebody Up There Likes Me (1956) - Capt. Lancheck (uncredited)
 The Vagabond King (1956) - Gaoler (uncredited)
 The Best Things in Life Are Free (1956) - Bootlegger (uncredited)
 The True Story of Jesse James (1957) - Sheriff Yoe (uncredited)
 Oh, Men! Oh, Women! (1957) - Mounted Policeman (uncredited)
 The Walter Winchell File (1957, Episode: "The Boy from Mason City")
 A Time to Love and a Time to Die (1958) - Sauer
 The Sheriff of Fractured Jaw (1958) - A Barber
 A Gift for Heidi (1958) - Dr. Roth
 Wild Youth (1960) - Erickson
 The Silent Call (1961) - Art - Neighbor (uncredited)
 Saintly Sinners (1962) - Idaho Murphy
 Incident in an Alley (1962) - Sam - Police Sergeant

References

External links
 
 
 

1906 births
1975 deaths
American male film actors
American male stage actors
Male actors from Idaho
People from Boise, Idaho
20th-century American male actors